Abibus of Nekressi (fl. 6th century) was one of the thirteen Assyrian apostles of Georgia and the bishop of Nekresi who arrived in Georgia under the leadership of St. Ioane of Zedazeni (John of Zedazeni). He began his activity as bishop in a village which was located in the hills in the eastern region of Kakheti.
According to the chronicle Life of Kartli, he was spreading Christianity not only among Georgians but also among the mountain tribes such as the Dagestani/Didoians, the ancient predecessors of modern Dagestan.

At that time there was a dark period of Persian rule in eastern Georgia. The main religion of Persians was Zoroastrianism - worship of fire. St. Abibos is said to have doused a sacred Zoroastrian flame with water. He was captured by the pagan priests, was tied up and beaten before be brought to the marzban. Simeon the Stylite of the Wonderful Mountain sent him  a letter, an eulogia (probably a piece of prosphoron) and a staff to strengthen his soul. He was stoned to death by Zoroastrian Persians at Rekhi and his body was dragged from the city and cast to the beasts.

In spite of the stringent prohibition to take his body the priests and monks of Rekhi stole it. They buried it with great honor at Samtavisi Monastery (located midway between Mtskheta and Gori). During the rule of Prince Stepanoz of Kartli, the relics of St. Abibos were relocated from Samtavisi to Samtavro Monastery in Mtskheta. They were buried under the holy altar at Samtavro Church.

His feast day had been kept on November 12 through 1700, but later changed to December 12 on the Gregorian calendar and November 29 on the Julian calendar correspondingly.

References

Sources
 Holweck, F. G. A Biographical Dictionary of the Saints. St. Louis, MO: B. Herder Book Co. 1924.
  

Year of birth unknown
6th-century bishops
Saints of Georgia (country)
6th-century Christian saints
Year of death unknown
Deaths by stoning